Daisy Door (born 30 January 1944 in Duisburg, real name Evelyn van Ophuisen) is a German Schlager music singer.

Biography 
As a child, Daisy Door sang on Radio Cologne. Her first recordings were performed with her sister Liane as "Li & Ev (e)"; A solo single was also issued. Later she was a member of the Botho-Lucas-Chor.

In 1971 she became famous as solo singer with the song Du lebst in deiner Welt (Highlights of My Dreams) composed and produced by Peter Thomas then with Als die Blumen Trauer trugen of the TV program Der Kommissar where she lent her voice to the unnamed actress . More than 500,000 copies of this title were sold within three months.

Daisy Door chose her pseudonym with reference to Doris Day. Her current name is Evelyn Ericson and she lives in Duisburg.

Singles

as Li & Eve 
 1964: Bestell ein Taxi, EMI Electrola 22 747 
 1965: Oh, Mama Mia Mutti, EMI Electrola E 23 036
 1965: Darling, Don’t Go, EMI Electrola E 23 097

as Eve 
 1965: Du bist für mich wie der Sonnenschein, EMI Electrola E 23 117

as Li & Ev 
 1966: Ben Sidih braucht Soldaten, EMI Electrola E 23 217
 1966: Dann kam die Liebe, EMI Electrola E 23 368

as Daisy Door 
 1967: Curry, EMI Electrola E 23 461
 1968: Mein Herz hat geschlossen, Vogue DV 14699
 1969: Im Mondschein ist alles anders, Vogue DV 84989
 1970: Mister Happiness, Vogue DV 11075
 1971: Schulmädchen, Ariola 10 337 AT (Titel aus „Der neue Schulmädchen-Report, 2. Teil“)
 1971: Du lebst in deiner Welt, Ariola 10 843 AT
 1971: Pop Corn
 1972: Komm und wir sind frei, Ariola 12 039 AT 
 1972: The Bigger Step You Take, Ariola 12 210 XT
 1972: Liebe fragt nicht nach Millionen, Ariola 12313 AT
 1973: Straße der Vergangenheit, Ariola 12 711 AT
 1973: Mein Paradies im Sonnenschein, Ariola 13 306 AT
 1974: Komm in mein Haus, Telefunken 6.12181
 1975: Im Wald da sind die Räuber, Ariola 16160

External links 
 
  Discographie de Daisy Door 
 Du lebst in deiner Welt on YouTube

German women pop singers
People from Duisburg
1944 births
Living people